The Chesapeake Bay impact crater is a buried impact crater, located beneath the mouth of Chesapeake Bay, United States. It was formed by a bolide that struck the eastern shore of North America about 35.5 ± 0.3 million years ago, in the late Eocene epoch. It is one of the best-preserved "wet-target" impact craters in the world.

Continued slumping of sediments over the rubble of the crater has helped shape the Chesapeake Bay.

Formation and aftermath
During the warm late Eocene, sea levels were high, and the tidewater region of Virginia lay in the coastal shallows. The shore of eastern North America, about where Richmond, Virginia is today, was covered with thick tropical rainforest, and the waters of the gently sloping continental shelf were rich with marine life that was depositing dense layers of lime from their microscopic shells.

The surrounding region suffered massive devastation. USGS scientist David Powars, one of the impact crater's discoverers, described the immediate aftermath: "Within minutes, millions of tons of water, sediment, and shattered rock were cast high into the atmosphere for hundreds of miles along the East Coast." An enormous megatsunami engulfed the land and possibly even reached the Blue Ridge Mountains. The sedimentary walls of the crater progressively slumped in, widened the crater, and formed a layer of huge blocks on the floor of the ring-like trough. The slump blocks were then covered with the rubble or breccia. The entire bolide event, from initial impact to the termination of breccia deposition, lasted only a few hours or days. In the perspective of geological time, the  breccia is an instantaneous deposit. The crater was then buried by additional sedimentary beds that have accumulated during the 35 million years following the impact.

The impact has been identified as the source of the North American tektite field, namely the Georgiaite and Bediasite fields.

Discovery

Until 1983 there was no evidence of a large impact crater buried beneath the lower part of the Chesapeake Bay and its surrounding peninsulas. The layer contained the fused glass beads called tektites and shocked quartz grains that are unmistakable signs of a bolide impact.

In 1993, data from oil exploration revealed the extent of the crater.

Effects on local rivers
The continual slumping of the rubble within the crater has affected the flow of the rivers and shaped the Chesapeake Bay. The impact crater created a long-lasting topographic depression which helped predetermine the course of local rivers and the eventual location of the Chesapeake Bay. Most important for present-day inhabitants of the area, the impact disrupted aquifers. The present freshwater aquifers lie above a deep salty brine, remnants of 100- to 145-million-year-old Early Cretaceous North Atlantic seawater, making the entire lower Chesapeake Bay area susceptible to groundwater contamination.

See also
 Toms Canyon structure probable impact crater  to the northeast.
 Popigai impact structure of similar age
 Grande Coupure
 Carolina bays

References

Bibliography
Poag, C. Wiley. Chesapeake Invader: Discovering America's Giant Meteorite Crater. Princeton, NJ: Princeton University Press, 1999. 
Post-impact Effects of the Eocene Chesapeake Bay Impact, Lower York-James Peninsula, Virginia, 31st Annual Meeting, Virginia Geological Field Conference, Williamsburg, Virginia, Oct. 19 and 20, 2001, G.H. Johnson et al. (fieldtrip guidebook)

External links

'Isostatic Rebound and its effects on the Chesapeake Bay'
A brief introduction to the Chesapeake Bay Impact Crater.
USGS, 'Investigating the Chesapeake Bay Impact Crater.'
USGS, 'The Chesapeake meteorite: message from the past.'
'The Chesapeake Bay bolide: modern consequences of an ancient cataclysm.'
 Earth Impact Database 
Satellite image of the region (from Google Maps)
Chesapeake Bay Impact Structure Deep Drilling Project
'North American Plate, mid-Atlantic Inversion a result of the Chesapeake Invader?' www.impacttectonics.org

Chesapeake Bay
Impact craters of the United States
Eocene impact craters
Megatsunamis